Ronald Victor Lynch (22 May 1923 – 28 June 2012) was an English cricketer. Lynch was a right-handed batsman who bowled slow left-arm orthodox. He was born at Stratford, Essex.

Lynch made his first-class debut for Essex against Nottinghamshire at the Old County Ground, Brentwood, in the 1954 County Championship. He made two further first-class appearances for the county in that season, against Northamptonshire at the Town Ground, Rushden, and Lancashire at Aigburth, Liverpool. In his three matches, he took a total of 4 wickets at an average of 26.75, with best figures of 4/64. With the bat he scored 7 runs.

Besides playing cricket, Lynch had a distinguished role as an administrator of the sport in Essex, as one of the driving forces behind the creation of the Essex League in 1972, serving as its Chairman from 1972 to 1993, and later as Honorary Vice President. He died in Woodford Green, London, on 28 June 2012, following a long illness. His funeral was held at the City of London Cemetery and Crematorium.

References

External links
Ron Lynch at ESPNcricinfo
Ron Lynch at CricketArchive

1923 births
2012 deaths
People from Stratford, London
English cricketers
Essex cricketers
English cricket administrators